Basketball at the 2011 Pacific Games was held from August 29–September 8, 2011 at several venues.

Events

Medal summary

Men

Preliminary round

Group A

Group B

Knockout stage

Bracket

5–8th bracket

Quarterfinals

5–8th place Semifinals

Semifinals

Seventh place game

Fifth place game

Third place game

Final

Women

Preliminary round

Group A

Group B

Knockout stage

Bracket

5–8th bracket

Quarterfinals

5–8th place Semifinals

Semifinals

Seventh place game

Fifth place game

Third place game

Final

References
Basketball at the 2011 Pacific Games

2011 Pacific Games
2011
Pacific